Alessandro Cerigioni (born 30 September 1992) is a Belgian footballer who currently plays for Dessel Sport in the Belgian National Division 1. He is of Italian descent.

Career
Cerigioni played several seasons for Lommel United in the Belgian Second Division from 2010 until 2012, scoring no less than 23 league goals. Still only 20 years, Cerigioni was signed by Oud-Heverlee Leuven in January 2013 and given his first few minutes away to Waasland-Beveren later that same month.

References

External links
 
 

1992 births
Living people
Belgian footballers
Belgium youth international footballers
Belgian people of Italian descent
Lommel S.K. players
Oud-Heverlee Leuven players
S.K. Beveren players
K.S.V. Roeselare players
K.F.C. Dessel Sport players
Belgian Pro League players
Challenger Pro League players
Association football forwards